A Lonely Place for Dying is a 2012 American independent drama-thriller film directed by Justin Eugene Evans and produced by James Cromwell. Starring Ross Marquand, Michael Wincott, Michael Scovotti and James Cromwell, the film is set in 1972 during the Cold War. The film's score was composed by Brent Daniels.

Plot
In 1972, an abandoned Mexican prison sits alone in the dusty Chihuahua desert. KGB mole Nikolai Dzerzhinsky waits for his contact from The Washington Post. Dzerzhinsky holds explosive evidence against the CIA; information he will trade for asylum in the United States. Special Agent Robert Harper must obtain this evidence and kill Dzerzhinsky or risk the end of his CIA career. As the two men hunt each other, they discover that the sins from their past destined them for this deadly confrontation.

Cast
 Ross Marquand as KGB Officer Nikolai Dzerzhinsky
 Michael Scovotti as CIA Agent Robert Harper
 Michael Wincott as CIA Project Manager Anthony Greenglass
 James Cromwell as Washington Post Editor-In-Chief Howard Simons
 Brad Culver as Special Forces Captain Robert "Bob" Altman
 Mike Peebler as Special Forces First Lieutenant George Roy Hill
 Luis Robledo as Special Forces Staff Sergeant Solares
 Jason R. Moore as Special Forces Staff Sergeant William "Bill" Friedkin
 Stephen Jules Rubin as Special Forces Buck Sergeant Konigsberg

Release
"A Lonely Place For Dying" held an unannounced sneak preview at the 2008 Santa Fe Film Festival. Despite being an out-of-competition rough-cut screening with no visual effects, music, sound mix or color grade, it was nominated for three awards and won the Heineken Red Star Award.

The first 22 minutes of the motion picture was released on VODO in July 2011. It was downloaded over one million times and became the best-seeded movie Torrent in the world for several weeks. "A Lonely Place For Dying" screened at its final three festivals and concluded its two-and-a-half-year-long festival run while "part one" of the film dominated Bittorrent.

After nearly three years on the festival circuit, "A Lonely Place For Dying" received a limited theatrical release on approximately 19 screens throughout the United States. It debuted on September 7, 2012 at the Al Ringling Theatre in Baraboo, Wisconsin and concluded its run on November 4 of the same year in several theaters in Portland, Oregon. The film played in theaters across Wisconsin, Idaho, Montana, Ohio, Oregon and Washington.

In February, 2013, it was released on iTunes and Amazon. On May 31, 2013, the filmmakers held a charity screening of "A Lonely Place for Dying" at Justin Eugene Evans' high school in Clackamas, Oregon. All proceeds went to Clackamas High School's speech and drama departments.

Accolades
"A Lonely Place for Dying" was an official selection of 46 film festivals where it was nominated for 53 awards and won 29 including 18 as best picture. The film began its festival run at the 2008 Santa Fe Film Festival and concluded its run as the Opening Night film for the 2011 Oaxaca Film. Fest Below is a partial list of the film's awards.

Reception
A Lonely Place for Dying was met with almost universal praise. Justine Browning of Huffington Post said "A Lonely Place for Dying (currently available on iTunes) is a powerful independent thriller from a promising new director Justin Eugene Evans." Andrew L. Urban of Urban Cinefile said "Executed with skill, the film uses its primary element - the abandoned Mexican prison - to terrific effect...excellent design and music, with terrific camerawork, complete what is arguably a better movie than many which get a theatrical release." Jesse Veverka of the Clyde Fitch Report refers to the film's director as an "independent narrative film prodigy." Charles Monroe Kane of WPT's "Director's Cut" said "A Lonely Place For Dying is an absolutely fantastic film!"

References

External links
 

 
 

American action thriller films
American crime drama films
2009 films
American spy films
Cold War spy films
Films set in 1972
Films set in Mexico
Censorship in Russia
2000s English-language films
2000s American films